The 2012 FIBA Europe Under-18 Championship for Women was the 29th edition of the FIBA Europe Under-18 Championship for Women. 16 teams featured in the competition, held in Romania from 26 July to 5 August 2012.

Participating teams

  (Winners, 2011 FIBA Europe Women's Under-18 Championship Division B)

  (Runners-up, 2011 FIBA Europe Women's Under-18 Championship Division B)

Final standings

References

External links
Official Site

2012
2012–13 in European women's basketball
2012–13 in Romanian basketball
International women's basketball competitions hosted by Romania
International youth basketball competitions hosted by Romania
2012 in youth sport
2012 in Romanian women's sport